A protein signal patch contains information to send a given protein to the indicated location in the cell. It is made up of amino acid residues that are distant to one another in the primary sequence, but come close to each other in the tertiary structure of the folded protein (see red patch in the diagram). Signal patches, unlike some signal sequences, are not cleaved from the mature protein after sorting. They are very difficult to predict. Nuclear localization signals are often signal patches although signal sequences also exist. They are found on proteins destined for the nucleus and enable their selective transport from the cytosol into the nucleus through the nuclear pore complexes.

See also
 protein targeting
 signal peptide

Protein targeting